Kristy Lynn Curry (née Sims; born October 30, 1966) is the head coach of the University of Alabama's women's basketball team, the Crimson Tide. She took the job in 2013.

Coaching career
Curry graduated from Northeast Louisiana University in 1988. Her career started with coaching jobs at Weston and Mansfield High Schools in her home state of Louisiana. She held several college assistant coaching jobs, including Tulane, Texas A&M, and Louisiana Tech. Immediately prior to taking her position with the Lady Raiders on March 30, 2006, she was the head coach of Purdue's women's basketball team.  In addition to two Big Ten championships, she led the Boilermakers to seven consecutive appearances in the NCAA tournament, including four appearances in the Sweet Sixteen, two appearances in the Elite Eight, one appearance in the Final Four, and one appearance in the national championship game (2001).

As head coach of the Texas Tech Lady Raiders, following the retirement of Hall of Fame coach Marsha Sharp, Curry embarked upon a rebuilding program as her tenure began in 2006, facing the challenges of new-era recruiting and the increased talent prevalent in the Big 12 Conference, especially Big 12 South opponents Baylor, Oklahoma, Texas, and Texas A&M, all of whom were frequently ranked in the Top 25 and contending for the national championship.  In her first six years at Texas Tech, Curry led the Lady Raiders to three appearances in the Women's National Invitational Tournament.

In January 2011, the Lady Raiders ascended to #26 in the AP national rankings (#25 in the Coaches' Poll), and on February 19, 2011, in the United Spirit Arena, the Lady Raiders upset the #1-ranked Baylor Bears.  In the regular-season finale on March 5, 2011, Texas Tech defeated the #18 Oklahoma Sooners for the Lady Raiders' third victory over a ranked opponent in seventeen days.  Texas Tech accepted an invitation to the NCAA Tournament.

In March 2011, Curry signed a five-year contract extension with Texas Tech.  Under Curry's leadership, the Lady Raiders began the 2011–12 season with 14 straight victories and were ranked #10 in the AP poll in early January 2012.

On January 9, 2013, Curry reached her 300th career victory, with a win over the Kansas State Wildcats with a score of 59–50 on her home court in Lubbock, Texas, with a career record of 300–141 (.680) at the time.  Curry guided the Texas Tech Lady Raiders to the 2013 NCAA Tournament, their second appearance in three years in the tournament.

Curry accepted the same position at The University of Alabama on May 11, 2013, and replaced former Crimson Tide basketball star Wendell Hudson as head coach.

Head coaching record

References

External links
 Alabama biography

1966 births
Living people
Alabama Crimson Tide women's basketball coaches
American women's basketball coaches
Basketball coaches from Louisiana
High school basketball coaches in Louisiana
People from LaSalle Parish, Louisiana
Purdue Boilermakers women's basketball coaches
Texas A&M Aggies women's basketball coaches
Texas Tech Lady Raiders basketball coaches
Tulane Green Wave women's basketball coaches
University of Louisiana at Monroe alumni